The 1893 Ohio gubernatorial election was held on November 2, 1893. Incumbent Republican William McKinley defeated Democratic nominee Lawrence T. Neal with 51.86% of the vote.

General election

Candidates
Major party candidates
William McKinley, Republican 
Lawrence T. Neal, Democratic

Other candidates
Gideon P. Macklin, Prohibition
Edward J. Bracken, People's

Results

References

1893
Ohio
Gubernatorial
William McKinley